Timothy Jarvis Carter (August 18, 1800 – March 14, 1838) was a United States representative from Maine. He was born in Bethel in the Maine district of Massachusetts on August 18, 1800. He attended the town schools of Bethel, studied law in Northampton, Massachusetts, was admitted to the bar in 1826 and commenced practice in Rumford, Maine.  He moved to Paris, Maine in 1827 and continued the practice of law.

He was appointed secretary of the Maine State Senate in 1833, was a county attorney 1833–1837.  He was elected as a Democrat to the Twenty-fifth Congress and served from March 4, 1837, until his death in Washington, D.C. on March 14, 1838.

Carter's siblings included Luther C. Carter, who also served in Congress.

See also
List of United States Congress members who died in office (1790–1899)

References

1800 births
1838 deaths
People from Bethel, Maine
American people of English descent
Democratic Party members of the United States House of Representatives from Maine
Democratic Party Maine state senators
County district attorneys in Maine
19th-century American politicians